Christopher Bowles (born 19 September 1957) is a British judoka. He competed in the men's half-middleweight event at the 1980 Summer Olympics.

Judo career
Bowles became champion of Great Britain, winning the light-middleweight division at the British Judo Championships in 1979. The following year he won a silver medal at the 1980 European Judo Championships in Vienna, competing in the under 71kg division he lost the gold medal match to Nicolae Vlad of Romania. 

In 1980, he was selected to represent Great Britain at the 1980 Summer Olympics, competing in the men's 78 kg division he failed to progress from Pool A after losing his second match to Bernard Tchoullouyan.

References

External links
 

1957 births
Living people
British male judoka
Olympic judoka of Great Britain
Judoka at the 1980 Summer Olympics
Place of birth missing (living people)
20th-century British people